Shane Boyd (born September 18, 1982) is an American football quarterback who is currently a free agent. He was signed by the Tennessee Titans as an undrafted free agent in 2005. He played college football for the Kentucky Wildcats.

Boyd has also been a member of the Cologne Centurions, Pittsburgh Steelers, Arizona Cardinals, Houston Texans, Montreal Alouettes, California Redwoods, Indianapolis Colts, Sacramento Mountain Lions, Milwaukee Mustangs, Tampa Bay Storm, Portland Thunder, Bluegrass Warhorses, San Antonio Talons, Arizona Rattlers, and Cleveland Gladiators.

Early years
In high school and college, Boyd played both baseball and football. He was drafted as a pitcher by the Minnesota Twins the 12th round of the 2004 MLB Draft but decided against signing.

He played football and baseball at Henry Clay High School in Lexington, Kentucky. His brother, Aaron, was a wide receiver at Kentucky.

College career
He played in thirty-six games at Kentucky, of which he started sixteen. He finished his college career with 2,484 passing yards, thirteen touchdown passes, 845 rushing yards and thirteen rushing touchdowns.

Statistics

Professional career
Boyd was rated the 50th best quarterback in the 2005 NFL Draft by NFLDraftScout.com.

Tennessee Titans
Boyd was signed by the Tennessee Titans before the 2005 season, but was released on August 29.

Pittsburgh Steelers
After being signed by the Pittsburgh Steelers, he was allocated to NFL Europe and played for the Cologne Centurions before being cut by the Steelers on September 2. Boyd became NFL Europe’s all-time leading rushing quarterback, amassing 339 yards on the ground to break Jon Kitna’s record by five yards.

Arizona Cardinals
Boyd spent most of the 2006 season on the Arizona Cardinals before being activated for the season finale. He was waived during final cuts on August 31, 2007.

Houston Texans
Boyd was signed to the Houston Texans' practice squad in October 2007. He was re-signed in the 2008 offseason, but waived on August 29.

Montreal Alouettes
Boyd was signed by the Montreal Alouettes on May 29, 2009, and released at the beginning of training camp, June 6, 2009.

California Redwoods
He was drafted by the California Redwoods on June 18, 2009.
 
He signed with the team on September 2 and scored the first ever UFL touchdown in the second quarter of the game on October 8. Boyd was the only one of the four starting quarterbacks in the UFL's first season to have never played a regular season NFL game.

Indianapolis Colts
Boyd was signed to the Indianapolis Colts' practice squad on December 2, 2009, but was waived on December 9.

Sacramento Mountain Lions
Boyd returned to the Redwoods (by this point relocated and rebranded as the Sacramento Mountain Lions) for 2010, only to be cut in the preseason as the team signed Daunte Culpepper to serve as the team's new starter.

Milwaukee Mustangs
Boyd played for the Milwaukee Mustangs in 2012.

Tampa Bay Storm
Boyd played for the Tampa Bay Storm in 2013.

Portland Thunder
On December 20, 2013, Boyd was selected by the Portland Thunder in the 2014 AFL Expansion Draft.

Bluegrass Warhorses

Boyd left the AFL and joined the Bluegrass Warhorses of the Continental Indoor Football League (CIFL) for the 2014 season. He was released after three games.

San Antonio Talons
Boyd was assigned to the San Antonio Talons of the AFL on April 2, 2014.

Arizona Rattlers
Boyd was assigned to the Arizona Rattlers on April 30, 2015, after Rattlers' starting quarterback, Nick Davila, was placed on injured reserve.

Cleveland Gladiators
Boyd was assigned to the Cleveland Gladiators on January 13, 2017. He started the team's first game of the season, completing 24 of 37 passes for 288 yards, five touchdowns and one interception in a 46–40 loss to the Tampa Bay Storm.

Baltimore Brigade
On May 22, 2017, Boyd and Brandon Thompkins were traded to the Baltimore Brigade for claim order positioning and future considerations. He started the team's final game of the regular season, completing 18 of 32 passes for 228 yards and four touchdowns in a 41–35 loss to the Washington Valor. He also started the team's playoff game, completing 21 of 33 passes for 324 yards, seven touchdowns and one interception in a 69–54 loss to the Philadelphia Soul. He rushed for another touchdown. On April 1, 2019, Boyd was again assigned to the Brigade.

References

External links

Just Sports Stats

1982 births
Living people
American football quarterbacks
American players of Canadian football
Canadian football quarterbacks
Kentucky Wildcats football players
Tennessee Titans players
Pittsburgh Steelers players
Cologne Centurions (NFL Europe) players
Arizona Cardinals players
Houston Texans players
Green Bay Packers players
Montreal Alouettes players
Sacramento Mountain Lions players
Indianapolis Colts players
Players of American football from Arizona
Milwaukee Mustangs (2009–2012) players
Tampa Bay Storm players
Portland Thunder players
Bluegrass Warhorses players
San Antonio Talons players
Arizona Rattlers players
Cleveland Gladiators players
Baltimore Brigade players